is a Japanese footballer who plays for Nagano Parceiro.

Career statistics
Updated to the start from 2023 season.

Club

References

External links
Profile at Azul Claro Numazu 

Profile at Kamatamare Sanuki 

1990 births
Living people
Juntendo University alumni
Association football people from Chiba Prefecture
Japanese footballers
J2 League players
J3 League players
Japan Football League players
Honda FC players
Kamatamare Sanuki players
Azul Claro Numazu players
Kagoshima United FC players
AC Nagano Parceiro players
Association football defenders